Andrew Soule may refer to:

 Andy Soule (born 1980), American Nordic skier
 Andrew M. Soule (1872–1934), American football coach and college dean